Joseph Jocelyn Gauvreau (born March 4, 1964) is a Canadian retired professional ice hockey defenceman who played two games in the National Hockey League for the Montreal Canadiens.

Gauvreau was born in Masham, Quebec.

Career statistics

External links

1964 births
Living people
Canadian ice hockey defencemen
Granby Bisons players
Hull Olympiques players
Ice hockey people from Quebec
Montreal Canadiens draft picks
Montreal Canadiens players
Nova Scotia Voyageurs players
People from Outaouais
Sherbrooke Canadiens players